Alfonso II d'Este (24 November 1533 – 27 October 1597) was Duke of Ferrara from 1559 to 1597.  He was a member of the House of Este.

Biography
He was the elder son of Ercole II d'Este and Renée de France, the daughter of Louis XII of France and Anne of Brittany and was the fifth and last Duke of Ferrara.

As a young man, he fought in the service of Henry II of France against the Habsburgs. Soon after his accession, he was forced by Pope Pius IV to send back his mother to France due to her Calvinist creed. The 1570 Ferrara earthquake fell into his reign. In 1583 he allied with Emperor Rudolf II in the war against the Turks in Hungary.

Throughout the 1550s, Alfonso had an interest in Castrato singing voices. Given his childlessness amongst multiple marriages, this additional fact has prompted some historians to speculate that the Duke was homosexual.

Marriages

He married three times:
On 3 July 1558, Alfonso married his first wife Lucrezia di Cosimo de' Medici  (14 February 1545 – 21 April 1561), a daughter of Cosimo I de' Medici, Grand Duke of Tuscany and Eleonora di Toledo.  She died two years afterwards, at just 16. Poisoning at the hand of the Duke has been suspected; however, pulmonary tuberculosis is the more widely accepted cause of death.
On 5 December 1565, Alfonso married his second wife Barbara of Austria (30 April 1539 – 19 September 1572), eighth daughter of Ferdinand I, Holy Roman Emperor and Anna of Bohemia and Hungary.
On 24 February 1579, Alfonso married his third wife Margherita Gonzaga (27 May 1564 – 6 January 1618). She was the eldest daughter of William I, Duke of Mantua and Eleonora of Austria. Margherita was the niece of his second wife Barbara.

He had no known children, legitimate or otherwise.

Succession
The legitimate line of the House of Este ended in 1597 with him.  Rudolf II, Holy Roman Emperor recognized as heir his cousin Cesare d'Este, member of a cadet branch, who continued to rule in the imperial duchies and carried on the family name. The succession as Duke of Este, however, was recognized only by the Emperor but not by the Popes. In 1598 Ferrara was therefore incorporated into the Papal States by Pope Clement VIII, on grounds of doubtful legitimacy. As a result of Alfonso's death Cesare d'Este and his family were "obliged to leave the city" and the power of the government was there after turned over to the cardinal legate.()

Patron of the arts and sciences

Alfonso II raised the glory of Ferrara to its highest point, and was the patron of Torquato Tasso, Giovanni Battista Guarini, and Cesare Cremonini—favouring the arts and sciences, as the princes of his house had always done. Besides being fluent in Italian he was also proficient in Latin and French. Luzzasco Luzzaschi served as his court organist.

In addition, he was the sponsor of the Concerto delle donne, a type of group which was to be copied all over Italy. He also restored the Castello Estense, damaged by an earthquake in 1570.

His expenses, however, went at damage of the public treasure.

Ancestors

In literature
Alfonso II is the duke upon whom Robert Browning based his poem My Last Duchess, and is a major character in the Maggie O'Farrell novel The Marriage Portrait.

References

External links
Illustrious people 

Candidates for the Polish elective throne
1533 births
1597 deaths
Alfonso 2
16th-century condottieri
Alfonso 2
Alfonso 2
Alfonso 2
Alfonso 2
Patrons of literature
16th-century Italian nobility
Burials at the Corpus Domini Monastery, Ferrara